Falk Island is one of the many uninhabited Canadian arctic islands in Qikiqtaaluk Region, Nunavut. It is a Baffin Island  located in Frobisher Bay, southeast of Iqaluit. Other islands in the immediate vicinity include Brook Island, Brigus Island, Fletcher Island, Gay Island, and Smith Island.

References 

Islands of Baffin Island
Uninhabited islands of Qikiqtaaluk Region
Islands of Frobisher Bay